Arnold Haukeland (28 March 1920 – 18 June 1983) was a Norwegian sculptor.

Biography
He was born at Verdal in Nord-Trøndelag, Norway. He was the son of Arnold Martin Haukeland (1891–1977) and Lilly Karoline Wallem (1896–1969). 
He attended the Norwegian Institute of Technology (NTH) in Trondheim where he studied engineering. During the German occupation of Norway, he studied sculpture with Per Palle Storm  and Stinius Fredriksen at the Illegal Academy. After the liberation of Norway at the end of World War II, he worked in the restoration studio of Nidaros Cathedral. In the spring of 1946 he was in Paris, where he briefly attended art school at Académie de la Grande Chaumiere. In 1946 Haukeland married photographer Randi Bothner  (1921–2012).

Among his sculptural works are Friheten from 1953 at Bærum City Hall, Ballspillere from 1958 at Sarpsborg Stadion, and Air from 1962 at the University of Oslo. He served as director of the Norwegian Sculptor Association (1958-1959) and of the Visual Artists’ Board (1976-1979). He was awarded the Prince Eugen Medal for sculpture in 1970 and decorated Knight, First Class of the Order of St. Olav in 1983.

References

Related reading
Arild Haaland (1971) Arnold Haukeland. Runer i rommet (Oslo: Gyldendal Norsk Forlag) 
Erik Dæhlin (1980)  Arnold Haukeland (Oslo: J.M. Stenersens Forlag)

External links
Haukeland's Work

1920 births
1983 deaths
People from Verdal
Norwegian Institute of Technology alumni
20th-century Norwegian sculptors
Recipients of the Prince Eugen Medal
Recipients of the St. Olav's Medal
Norwegian contemporary artists